2019 Rajya Sabha elections were held throughout 2019, to fill the vacancies in the Rajya Sabha, the Indian Parliament's upper chamber. The elections were held to elect 2 members from Assam as well as 6 members from Tamil Nadu. By-elections were held for 14 seats among various states.

The elections resulted in the ruling BJP maintaining and increasing their majority with a net gain of 6 seats.

Results

Elections

Assam

Tamil Nadu

By-elections
Aside from automatic elections, unforeseen vacancies caused by members' resignation, death or disqualification, are unless a few months before the expected natural expiry of the term of tenure, filled via by-elections, which for the Rajya Sabha often take some months to organise.

Bihar

 On 23 May 2019 Ravi Shankar Prasad Resigned from membership of the Rajya Sabha from Bihar due to his election as the member of Lok Sabha From Patna Sahib
 On 8 September 2019 Ram Jethmalani Had Died

Gujarat

 On 23 May 2019 Amit Shah Resigned from membership of the Rajya Sabha from Gujarat due to his election as the member of Lok Sabha From Gandhinagar
 On 24 May 2019 Smriti Irani Resigned from membership of the Rajya Sabha from Gujarat due to her election as the member of Lok Sabha From Amethi

Odisha
 On 24 May 2019 Achyuta Samanta Resigned from membership of the Rajya Sabha from Odisha due to his election as the member of Lok Sabha From Kandhamal
 On 6 June 2019 Soumya Ranjan Patnaik Resigned from membership of the Rajya Sabha from Odisha due to his election as the member of  Odisha Legislative Assembly From Khandapada
 On 6 June 2019 Pratap Keshari Deb Resigned from membership of the Rajya Sabha from Odisha due to his election as the member of  Odisha Legislative Assembly From Aul

Rajasthan

 24 June 2019 Madan Lal Saini Had Died

Uttar Pradesh

 On 15 July 2019 Neeraj Sekhar Resigned from membership of the Rajya Sabha from Uttar Pradesh And Membership Of Samajwadi Party And Joined Bharatiya Janata Party
 On 2 August 2019 Surendra Singh Nagar Resigned from membership of the Rajya Sabha from Uttar Pradesh And Membership Of Samajwadi Party And Joined Bharatiya Janata Party
 On 5 August 2019 Sanjay Seth Resigned from membership of the Rajya Sabha from Uttar Pradesh And Membership Of Samajwadi Party And Joined Bharatiya Janata Party
 On 24 August 2019 Arun Jaitley Had Died
On 24 October 2019 Tazeen Fatma Resigned from membership of the Rajya Sabha from Uttar Pradesh due to her election as the member of Uttar Pradesh Legislative Assembly On  21 October by-poll From Rampur

Karnataka
 On 16 October 2019 K. C. Ramamurthy Resigned from membership of the Rajya Sabha from Karnataka And Membership of Indian National Congress And Joined Bharatiya Janata Party

See also
 2019 Indian general election

Notes

References

2019
Rajya